Parnassius phoebus, known as the Phoebus Apollo or small Apollo, is a butterfly species of the swallowtail butterfly family, Papilionidae, found in the Palearctic and North America.

P. phoebus is found in the Alps, Urals, Siberia, Kazakhstan, Mongolia, China, Alaska and Canada south through the United States to Utah and New Mexico.

Description
Male: the costal spots of forewing usually without red, the anterior one sometimes with white pupil; submarginal band faint and abbreviated or interrupted; no spot at hind margin; hindwing with red ocelli which are usually small, and sometimes with a submarginal row of feebly marked black spots; the veins often marked with well-defined elongate black punctures.

Female: with better defined and more extended markings; vitreous margin of forewing separated from the submarginal band by large white uniform spots; the second costal spots often pupilled red, connected with one another by black scaling, on disc sometimes blackish shadows; on hindwing a greyish vitreous marginal band, distinct submarginal half-moons, which are contiguous, forming a band, two larger red ocelli, the posterior one occasionally with white pupil; anal spots sometimes intensified and one of them filled in with red.

Habitat
Mountains at 1,600 to 2,800 meters, in particular between 1,800 and 2,200 meters above sea level, in humid damp and wet places such as edges of mountain streams and near springs and fresh seepages and in valleys (Schneetälchen) according to the preferences of its caterpillar food plant.

Larval foods
Saxifraga species
Sedum species
Sempervivum montanum

Subspecies 
P. phoebus has the following subspecies:

 Parnassius phoebus alpestris Verity, 1911
 Parnassius phoebus var. anna Stichel, 1907
 Parnassius phoebus aktashicus
 Parnassius phoebus alaskensis Eisner, 1956
 Parnassius phoebus altaica Ménétriés, 1859
 Parnassius phoebus amalthea Bryk & Eisner, 1935
 Parnassius phoebus ampliusmaculata Bryk, 1929
 Parnassius phoebus apricatus Stichel, 1906
 Parnassius phoebus var. aristion Fruhstorfer, 1923
 Parnassius phoebus var. astriotes Fruhstorfer, 1923
 Parnassius phoebus badmaevi Martynenko & Gluschenko, 2001
 Parnassius phoebus bajangolus Yakovlev, 2006
 Parnassius phoebus basimaculata Bryk & Eisner, 1935
 Parnassius phoebus behrii Edwards, 1870
 Parnassius phoebus biexcelsior Bryk & Eisner, 1935
 Parnassius phoebus var. blachieri Fruhstorfer, 1921
 Parnassius phoebus bulawskii
 Parnassius phoebus catullius Fruhstorfer, 1923
 Parnassius phoebus cardinalis Oberthür, 1891
 Parnassius phoebus var. casta Stichel, 1907
 Parnassius phoebus cerenus Martin, 1922
 Parnassius phoebus chingizid Yakovlev, 2006
 Parnassius phoebus var. confederationis Fruhstorfer, 1921
 Parnassius phoebus corybas Fischer De Waldheim, 1836
 Parnassius phoebus costalinigroocellata Bryk & Eisner, 1935
 Parnassius phoebus crocedominensis Nardelli & Sala, 1986
 Parnassius phoebus cubitalis Bryk & Eisner 1937
 Parnassius phoebus var. cutullius Fruhstorfer, 1923
 Parnassius phoebus dakotaensis Bryk & Eisner, 1935
 Parnassius phoebus discocircumcincta Eisner 1955
 Parnassius phoebus eisneri Bryk, 1928
 Parnassius phoebus elias Bryk, 1934
 Parnassius phoebus ernaeides Bryk & Eisner, 1937
 Parnassius phoebus ernestinae Bryk & Eisner, 1935
 Parnassius phoebus var. expectatus Fruhstorfer, 1921
 Parnassius phoebus fermata Bryk, 1921
 Parnassius phoebus festal Turati, 1932
 Parnassius phoebus flavomaculata Moltrecht, 1933
 Parnassius phoebus fortuna A Bang-Haas, 1912
 Parnassius phoebus var. gulschenkoi Iwamoto, 1997
 Parnassius phoebus gazelii Previel, 1936
 Parnassius phoebus golovinus Holland, 1930
 Parnassius phoebus grundi Bryk & Eisner, 1935
 Parnassius phoebus guppyi Wyatt, 1971
 Parnassius phoebus halasicus Huang & Murayama, 1992
 Parnassius phoebus hansi Bryk, 1945
 Parnassius phoebus hardwicki Kane, 1885
 Parnassius phoebus hermador dos Passos, 1964
 Parnassius phoebus hermadur Brown & Eff & Rotger, 1856
 Parnassius phoebus var. hermiston Fruhstorfer, 1922
 Parnassius phoebus herrichi Oberthür, 1891
 Parnassius phoebus hollandi Bryk & Eisner, 1935
 Parnassius phoebus intermedius Ménétriés,1849
 Parnassius phoebus intermedioides Storace, 1951
 Parnassius phoebus interpositus Herz, 1903
 Parnassius phoebus kamtchatica Ménétries, 1886
 Parnassius phoebus lessini Sala, 1996
 Parnassius phoebus leonhardi Rühl ,1892
 Parnassius phoebus leucostigma Austaut, 1912
 Parnassius phoebus magnus W G Wright, 1905
 Parnassius phoebus manitobaensis Bryk & Eisner, 1935
 Parnassius phoebus mariae Bryk, 1912
 Parnassius phoebus maximus Bryk & Eisner, 1937
 Parnassius phoebus melanica Verity, 1911
 Parnassius phoebus melanophorus Bryk, 1921
 Parnassius phoebus mendicus Stichel ,1907
 Parnassius phoebus minor Verity, 1907
 Parnassius phoebus minusculus Bryk,1912
 Parnassius phoebus montanulus Bryk & Eisner, 1931
 Parnassius phoebus montanus Ehrmann, 1918
 Parnassius phoebus muelleri Uffeln, 1920
 Parnassius phoebus nanus Neumoegen, 1890
 Parnassius phoebus nigerrimus Verity, 1907
 Parnassius phoebus nigrescens Wheeler 1903
 Parnassius phoebus nikolaii Asahi, Kohara, Kanda & Kawata, 1999
 Parnassius phoebus nox Bryk & Eisner, 1935
 Parnassius phoebus ocellata Verity, 1907
 Parnassius phoebus ochotskensis Bryk & Eisner, 1931
 Parnassius phoebus olympianus Burdick, 1941
 Parnassius phoebus orbifer Bryk & Eisner, 1935
 Parnassius phoebus var. palamedes Hemming, 1934
 Parnassius phoebus paradisiacus Turati, 1932
 Parnassius phoebus phoebus
 Parnassius phoebus pholus Barnes & Benjamin, 1926
 Parnassius phoebus plurimaculata Nitsche, 1913
 Parnassius phoebus polus Ehrmann, 1917
 Parnassius phoebus pseudocorybas Verity, 1907
 Parnassius phoebus pseudorotgeri Eisner, 1966
 Parnassius phoebus quincunx Bryk ,1915
 Parnassius phoebus reducta O. Bang-Haas, 1938
 Parnassius phoebus rocky Grum-Grshimallo ,1890
 Parnassius phoebus rotgeri Bang-Haas, 1938
 Parnassius phoebus rubina Wyatt, 1961
 Parnassius phoebus rückbeili Deckert, 1909
 Parnassius phoebus sacerdozi Fruhstorfer, 1906
 Parnassius phoebus sauricus Lukhtanov, 1999
 Parnassius phoebus savoieensis Eisner, 1957
 Parnassius phoebus sayii Edwards ,1863
 Parnassius phoebus sayii f. hermodur Edwards, 1881
 Parnassius phoebus sedakovi Ménétriés, 1850
 Parnassius phoebus var. serenus Fruhstorfer, 1921
 Parnassius phoebus smintheus Doubleday, 1847
 Parnassius phoebus sordellus Fruhstorfer, 1923
 Parnassius phoebus styriacus Fruhstorfer, 1851
 Parnassius phoebus sternitzki McDunnough, 1936
 Parnassius phoebus tersa Verity, 1947
 Parnassius phoebus tessinorum Fruhstorfer, 1921
 Parnassius phoebus tsenguun Churkin, 2003
 Parnassius phoebus uralensis Ménétriés, 1859
 Parnassius phoebus utahensis Rothschild, 1918
 Parnassius phoebus vaschenkoi Hirschfeld & Schäffler, 2004
 Parnassius phoebus velutus Martin, 1922
 Parnassius phoebus verity Ehrmann, 1918
 Parnassius phoebus veronicolus Martin, 1922
 Parnassius phoebus werschoturovi O. Bang-Haas, 1934
 Parnassius phoebus var. virginea Austaut, 1910
 Parnassius phoebus vorbrodti Bryk & Eisner, 1943
 Parnassius phoebus xanthus Ehrmann, 1918
 Parnassius phoebus yukonensis Eisner, 1969
 Parnassius phoebus zamolodtschikovi A. Belik, 1996

Similar species
Parnassius smintheus, which is a closely related species found in North America, is often misidentified as Parnassius phoebus. Some researchers also tend to split the North American population of Parnassius smintheus into two or three species, the northernmost of which are usually regarded as being part of P. phoebus, while the rest is considered to be P. smintheus.

References

Bernard Turlin et Luc Manil, 2005 Étude synoptique et répartition mondiale des espèces du genre "Parnassius" Latreille 1804 ("Lepidoptera Papilionidae") Luc Manil, Paris.

External links

Rusinsects Text, photographs.
 Tree line and Parnassius phoebus smintheus.

phoebus
Butterflies described in 1793
Butterflies of Europe